Lekoane Lekoane (born 6 March 1969) is a  Mosotho retired footballer who is last known to have played as a striker for Arcadia Shepherds.

Career

In 1995, Lekoane signed for South African top flight side Kaizer Chiefs, where he said, "Playing for Chiefs was no easy for me, some of my teammates did not like me and they made life real difficult from the first day I joined the club. But I told myself I was there to play football and shine." In 1997, he signed for Dynamos in the South African second division, helping them earn promotion to the South African top flight but left due to injury. In 2000, Lekoane retired after being shot by thieves.

References

External links

 

Living people
1969 births
Lesotho footballers
Association football forwards
Expatriate soccer players in South Africa
Lesotho international footballers
Kaizer Chiefs F.C. players
Dynamos F.C. (South Africa) players
Arcadia Shepherds F.C. players